The Archdiocese of Zamboanga (Latin name: Archdiocesis Zamboangensis) is a Catholic archdiocese in the Philippines. Its present jurisdiction includes Zamboanga City, with suffragans in Basilan (Territorial Prelature of Isabela) and Zamboanga Sibugay (Diocese of Ipil). It became Mindanao's first diocese in 1910, and was established as the second archdiocese of Mindanao in 1958. Today, the archdiocese covers a land area of 1,648 square kilometers and has a population of 442,345, of which 81 per cent are Catholics. The archdiocese includes 27 parishes and two quasi-parishes served by 49 diocesan and 18 religious priests. There are also 51 religious sisters working in the archdiocese. Following the death of Romulo T. Dela Cruz on December 10, 2021, the Metropolitan See is considered as vacant (sede vacante). Auxiliary Bishop Moises M. Cuevas is currently seated as the Apostolic Administrator of the Archdiocese since August 2021.

History
From 1607 to 1910, the entire island of Mindanao was under the Diocese of Cebu and Jaro. On April 10, 1910, Pope Pius X created the Diocese of Zamboanga and gave it jurisdiction over the whole island of Mindanao, including the adjacent islands of the Sulu Archipelago and the island of Cagayan de Sulu.

The Catholic faith was brought to Zamboanga by Jesuit missionaries Melchor de Vera and Alejandro Lopez in 1635. The efforts of the Spanish authorities to subdue the Muslims resulted in reprisal raids in Zamboanga and the Visayan Islands. In 1636, Fort Pilar, in honor of Our Lady of the Pillar, was constructed by priest-engineer de Vera. The Jesuit priests Francesco Palliola and Alejandro Lopez died as martyrs in their efforts to win the tribespeople through diplomacy. The establishment of Fort Pilar gave birth to the future city of Zamboanga.

On January 20, 1933, Pope Pius XI divided Mindanao into two areas. Southern Mindanao including the Sulu Archipelago became under the jurisdiction of Zamboanga. Northern Mindanao became under the Diocese of Cagayan de Oro. 

On April 28, 1934, Pius XI promulgated an apostolic constitution with the incipit Romanorum Pontificum semper separating the dioceses of Cebu, Calbayog, Jaro, Bacolod, Zamboanga and Cagayan de Oro from the ecclesiastical province of Manila. The same constitution elevated the diocese of Cebu into an archdiocese while placing all the newly separated dioceses under a new ecclesiastical province with Cebu as the new metropolitan see.

In 1951, Cagayan de Oro became an archdiocese, the first in the island of Mindanao. All episcopal jurisdictions in Mindanao and Sulu, including Zamboanga, became suffragans of this archdiocese.

The Diocese of Zamboanga was further divided when the Prelature Nullius of Davao was established and separated in 1949, the Prelature of Cotabato in 1950, the Prelature of Isabela, Basilan in 1963 and the Prelature of Ipil in 1979.

Zamboanga was established an archdiocese on May 15, 1958 by Pope Pius XII. As an ecclesiastical province, the Archdiocese of Zamboanga included Zamboanga City and had as suffragans the Prelature of Ipil in Zamboanga Sibugay, the Prelature of Isabela in Basilan and the Apostolic Vicariate of Jolo. Its titular patroness is Our Lady of the Pillar, and its secondary patron is Saint Pius X.

The Second Plenary Council of the Philippines adopted the Community of Disciples as the prime model of the Church, with focus on being a Church of the Poor. The challenge for the archdiocese in Zamboanga is to incarnate the vision of PCP II.

An Archdiocesan Pastoral Assembly was held early in 1995, formalizing preparations for the Second Archdiocesan Pastoral Assembly of Zamboanga in 1996.

Among the Catholic institutions in the Archdiocese of Zamboanga are 2 colleges, 6 secondary schools, 6 elementary schools, and 8 kindergarten schools. Charitable and social institutions include a leprosarium, 5 free clinics, 1 orphanage and 1 child center.

In 2010, the Zamboanga archdiocese celebrated the 100th anniversary of its establishment as the first diocese in Mindanao with a commemorative mass on April 12, 2010. The 50th or golden anniversary of its establishment as an archdiocese (1958-2008) was part of this celebration.

Suffragan diocese and territorial prelature
Diocese of Ipil
Territorial Prelature of Isabela

Ordinaries

Bishop of Zamboanga (1910-1958)

Archbishop of Zamboanga (1958-present)

Auxiliary bishops
 Leopoldo Arayata Arcaira (1961-1966), appointed Auxiliary Bishop of Malolos
 Jesus Yu Varela (1967-1971), appointed Bishop of Ozamis
 Antonio Realubin Tobias (1982-1983)
 Moises Magpantay Cuevas (2020–2021); appointed Apostolic Administrator of Zamboanga (2021–present)

Feasts Proper to the Archdiocese of Zamboanga  
August 21 – Memorial of Saint Pius X, pope and secondary patron of the Archdiocese of Zamboanga

October 12 – SOLEMNITY OF THE BLESSED VIRGIN MARY, OUR LADY OF THE PILLAR (Nuestra Señora Virgen del Pilar), Patroness of the Archdiocese of Zamboanga

See also
Roman Catholicism in the Philippines

References

Zamboanga
Archdiocese
Zamboanga City
Religion in Zamboanga del Sur